Alfredo "Alfee" Reft  (born December 15, 1982) is an American volleyball coach and former player.

Career

Playing career

Reft transferred to Hawaii from UC Santa Barbara. He played as a libero and was named an AVCA First-Team All-American as well as Asics/Volleyball Magazine Defensive Player of the Year in 2005 after totaling 272 digs. He set a Hawaii single-season record with 2.67 digs per set. He also earned AVCA Second-Team All-America honors in 2006 following his senior season.

Reft was part of the United States men's national volleyball team at the 2014 FIVB Volleyball Men's World Championship in Poland. He played for Dinamo Moscow.

Coaching career

Reft has serves as an assistant coach at various universities (Minnesota, Illinois, and San Diego). At San Diego, he helped the Toreros reach their first ever NCAA Final Four appearance in school history in 2022.

He was named head coach for UCLA Bruins women's volleyball team on December 19, 2022.

Head coaching record

References

External links
 

1982 births
Living people
American men's volleyball players
Illinois Fighting Illini women's volleyball coaches
San Diego Toreros women's volleyball coaches
UCLA Bruins women's volleyball coaches
Minnesota Golden Gophers women's volleyball coaches
UC Santa Barbara Gauchos men's volleyball players
Hawaii Rainbow Warriors volleyball players
Expatriate volleyball players in Russia
LGBT volleyball players
American expatriate sportspeople in Russia